Agrinierite (chemical formula ) is a mineral often found in the oxidation zone of uranium deposits. The IMA symbol is Agn.  It is named for Henry Agrinier (1928–1971), an engineer for the Commissariat à l'Énergie Atomique.

See also
 List of minerals

References

External links 
Mindat.org - Agrinierite
Webmineral.com - Agrinierite
Handbook of Mineralogy - Agrinierite 

Uranium(IV,VI) minerals
Orthorhombic minerals